Michel Périard (born November 10, 1979) is a Canadian-German professional ice hockey defenceman who is currently an unrestricted free agent who last played for the Jonquière Marquis in the Ligue Nord-Américaine de Hockey (LNAH).

Périard played for several minor-league teams across four leagues before moving to the Deutsche Eishockey Liga in 2005 where he remained until 2017. He holds a German passport since October 2015.

Playing career
Périard played junior hockey with Shawinigan Cataractes from 1997 until 1999, when he was traded to the Rimouski Oceanic to play with the club in the run to the Memorial Cup.

Périard was selected by the Ottawa Senators in the seventh round (188th overall) of the 1998 NHL Entry Draft, but did not sign with the club in the two years after the draft. He became a free agent and signed with the Florida Panthers in August 2000. Périard was assigned to the Rockford Ice Hogs for the 2000–01 season. Périard would play the next four seasons with various American minor league teams.

In 2005, Périard moved to Europe, signing with the Nürnberg Ice Tigers of the Deutsche Eishockey Liga (DEL). He has played since then in the DEL. In 2009, he transferred to Frankfurt Lions. He played the 2010–11 season with the Adler Mannheim of the DEL.

Upon completion of the 2012–13 season, Périard agreed to return for his third year with Ingolstadt in signing a one-year contract extension on April 30, 2013.

On September 7, 2015, Périard belatedly signed a contract to remain in Germany, agreeing to a one-year contract with the Iserlohn Roosters. In February 2016, it was announced that Périard has signed a contract extension with the Roosters that will keep him at the club through the 2016–17 season. After the 2016–17 season with the Roosters, in which he posted 15 assists, as Iserlohn finished out of playoff contention, it was announced that Périard's contract would not be renewed.

Career statistics

Awards and honours
Emile Bouchard Trophy - QMJHL Defenceman of the Year (1999–2000)
Memorial Cup Champion with Rimouski Océanic (2000)
Memorial Cup All-Star Team (2000)
Played in the CHL All-Star game (2002–03)
Central Hockey League Most Outstanding Defenceman (2002–03)

References

External links

1979 births
Adler Mannheim players
Canadian ice hockey defencemen
ERC Ingolstadt players
Frankfurt Lions players
Iserlohn Roosters players
Laredo Bucks players
Living people
Louisville Panthers players
Macon Whoopee (ECHL) players
Nürnberg Ice Tigers players
Ottawa Senators draft picks
Port Huron Border Cats players
Portland Pirates players
Rimouski Océanic players
Rockford IceHogs (UHL) players
San Antonio Rampage players
Shawinigan Cataractes players
People from Saint-Constant, Quebec
Canadian expatriate ice hockey players in Germany